DiNapoli is a surname. Notable people with the surname include:

Gennaro DiNapoli (born 1975), American football player
Joseph DiNapoli (born 1935), American mobster
Louis DiNapoli (born 1938), American mobster
Thomas DiNapoli (born 1954), American politician
Vincent DiNapoli (1937–2005), American mobster